The Tușnad is a left tributary of the river Olt in Romania. It discharges into the Olt in the village Tușnad.

References

Rivers of Romania
Rivers of Harghita County